Mark Duane Wagner (born March 4, 1954) is a retired Major League Baseball infielder. He played with the Detroit Tigers, Texas Rangers, and Oakland Athletics between 1976 and 1984.

Wagner was born in 1954 in Conneaut, Ohio. He attended Harbor High School in Ashtabula, Ohio.

He was drafted by the Detroit Tigers in the 1972 amateur draft and played for the Tigers  shortstop from 1976 to 1980. He was traded from the Tigers to the Rangers for Kevin Saucier on December 10, 1980. He played with the Rangers from 1981 to 1983. In April 1984, he signed as a free agent with the Oakland Athletics. He appeared in his final major league game on September 30, 1984, with Oakland.  On August 20, 1984, he also pitched the final 1 innings against the Detroit Tigers, giving up two hits and no runs in a 14-1 loss.

Over nine seasons in the major leagues, Wagner played in 414 games and had a .243 batting average, 205 hits, 81 runs scored, 71 RBIs, 61 walks, 20 doubles, 12 RBIs, nine triples and three home runs.

References

External links
, or Retrosheet
Venezuelan Winter League

1954 births
Living people
Baseball players from Ohio
Bristol Tigers players
Buffalo Bisons (minor league) players
Chattanooga Lookouts players
Clinton Pilots players
Detroit Tigers players
Evansville Triplets players
Lakeland Tigers players
Major League Baseball shortstops
Minor league baseball managers
Navegantes del Magallanes players
American expatriate baseball players in Venezuela
Oakland Athletics players
People from Conneaut, Ohio
Sun City Rays players
Tacoma Tigers players
Texas Rangers players
West Palm Beach Tropics players